Péter Veres (6 January 1897 – 16 April 1970) was a Hungarian politician and writer, who served as Minister of Defence from 1947 to 1948.

References
 Magyar Életrajzi Lexikon

1897 births
1970 deaths
People from Balmazújváros
People from the Kingdom of Hungary
Social Democratic Party of Hungary politicians
National Peasant Party (Hungary) politicians
Members of the Hungarian Socialist Workers' Party
Defence ministers of Hungary
Members of the National Assembly of Hungary (1945–1947)
Members of the National Assembly of Hungary (1947–1949)
Members of the National Assembly of Hungary (1949–1953)
Members of the National Assembly of Hungary (1953–1958)
Members of the National Assembly of Hungary (1958–1963)
Members of the National Assembly of Hungary (1963–1967)
Members of the National Assembly of Hungary (1967–1971)
Austro-Hungarian military personnel of World War I